George Simpson Drynan Pattullo (4 November 1888 – 5 September 1953) was a Scottish football player and manager active primarily in Spain. He has been described as FC Barcelona's "most import and influential British of all time."

Biography
Born in Glasgow, Pattulo moved to Barcelona in Spain whilst working as a coal trader, playing rugby, field hockey, tennis and eventually football there. He made his football debut for Barcelona in September 1910, and scored 20 goals in 41 matches during the 1910–11 season, playing for the club between September 1910 and May 1911, when he had to return to Scotland on business, however, in 1912, he was called up to play the quarter-finals of the 1912 Pyrenees Cup on 10 March against city rivals Espanyol, netting two goals to help Barça to a 3–2 win in what was his last match for the club, which went on to win the tournament after beating Stade Bordelais 5–3 in the final. 

Pattullo remained as an amateur player, and refused to sign for Espanyol. He originally played as a goalkeeper, but later converted to a forward. 

He left Barcelona before World War I, returning to Great Britain to join the Tyneside Scottish Brigade; he was awarded the Military Cross. He also managed Club Baleares briefly in 1930. He returned to Spain in 1928 thinking the climate would help him with his recovery from being gassed during the War.

References

1888 births
1953 deaths
Scottish footballers
Scottish football managers
FC Barcelona players
Recipients of the Military Cross
British Army personnel of World War I
Royal Northumberland Fusiliers officers
Footballers from Glasgow
Scottish expatriate footballers
Scottish expatriate football managers
Expatriate footballers in Spain
Expatriate football managers in Spain
Scottish expatriate sportspeople in Spain
Association football forwards
Association football goalkeepers
Burials at Cathcart Cemetery